Kanara Entrepreneurs (KE) is a non-profit mutual benefit corporation in the Kanara region of the Indian state Karnataka whose stated mission is to encourage, support, guide, and mentor potential and early-stage entrepreneurs. According to their website, KE aims to provide networking opportunities and counseling to their members. Membership is open to entrepreneurs, senior corporate executives, and senior professionals residing in, or associated with, the Kanara region, and requires an annual fee for admittance. 

KE has affiliations with Dimensions in Mumbai and Rachana in Mangalore and has hosted a joint networking event in 2011 at the Hotel Grand Magrath.

KE has signed MOUs (Memorandums of Understanding) with several educational institutions including Christ University in Bangalore, St. Josephs Institute of Management in Bangalore, and St. Aloysius Institute of Management and Information Technology in Mangalore, providing their students with regular hourly sessions with KE members.

In 2014, KE hosted a two-day entrepreneurship convention called Entreprenet held at the Park Plaza Hotel with 400 in attendance, including local entrepreneurs, corporate executives, and the Archbishop of Bangalore.

Gallery

Footnote

References

 Social groups of Karnataka